Divine Lovers is a 1997 Bollywood film directed by Babbar Subhash. The film's cast includes Maxwell Caulfield, Hemant Birje, and Shannon McLeod.

Plot
The story is about lovers from previous lives meeting in India. The story starts with a young village girl, Urvashi, being captured by some henchmen belonging to a local sculptor, Gregory. She is taken to a cave and forced to undress and pose nude with a man, Chandra, for some time to allow the sculptor to sculpt their figures on the rocks. The couple are required to present more poses and, in the process, fall in love. When Gregory leaves the caves, Urvashi and Chandra consummate their relationship. However, they are caught by the sculptor, who hits Chandra on the head with a hammer. A fire occurs in the cave and kills Chandra, while the sculptor takes the girl away.

In a modern time, the 1990s, in India, a local prince marries Reeta, a local girl (later revealed to be a reincarnation of Urvashi). Meanwhile, Jeff, an architect in the US, (later revealed to be the reincarnation of Chandra) has frequent nightmares about a sculptor killing him. He visits India on a trip to a recently discovered archaeological site, the cave where the sculptor Gregory worked and where Chandra was killed. While in India, Jeff bonds with Reeta, the new princess, without knowing that she was his lover some centuries ago. The prince is a womaniser and has multiple affairs. He also mistreats the princess.

The princess and the architect fall in love. While visiting the archaeological site, the two realise that this is the same site where they consummated their love in their past lives. They once again consummate their new-found love for each other. During this act, the prince comes to the site. The prince is shown to be somewhat of a reincarnation of the sculptor. He hits the architect. The architect and the princess overpower the prince and he is killed, allowing the lovers to reunite. However, a minor earthquake results in the entrance to the caves being closed and the lovers to be trapped inside. As they accept their fate, the princess says, "A few moments of love is better than a lifetime without it", to which the architect replies, "Chandra and Urvashi will never die", implying that they are content with dying together, having each other at long last.

Cast
 Maxwell Caulfield as Jeff Thompson
 Shannon McLeod as Reeta / Urvashi
 Marc Zuber as Prince Kabir
 Kim Sill as Gisela (as Kimberly Dawson)
 Richard Lynch as Gregory
 Hemant Birje as Chandra
 Tom Alter as Dr. Taubman
 Girja Shankar as Dr. Pran
 Anil Nagrath as Heinz
 Viju Khote as Mukerjee

References

 

Indian drama films
English-language Indian films
1997 films
Indian films set in New York City
Films about reincarnation
1997 drama films
Films directed by Babbar Subhash
1990s English-language films